Seongsan Ilchulbong, also called ‘Sunrise Peak’, is an archetypal tuff cone formed by hydrovolcanic eruptions upon a shallow seabed about 5 thousand years ago. Situated on the eastern seaboard of Jeju Island and said to resemble a gigantic ancient castle, this tuff cone is 182 meters high, has a preserved bowl-like crater and also displays diverse inner structures resulting from the sea cliff. These features are considered to be of geologic worth, providing information on eruptive and depositional processes of hydromagmatic volcanoes worldwide as well as past volcanic activity of Seongsan Ilchulbong itself.

Geological characteristics
Seongsan Ilchulbong Tuff Cone was formed by Surtseyan-type hydrovolcanic activity upon a shallow seabed about 5,000 years ago when the sea level was same as the present. Most volcanic cones or oreums (Jeju dialect for volcanic cones) were formed by piles of scoria cones which are created by Hawaiian eruptions or Strombolian eruptions. But Seongsan Ilchulbong Tuff Cone and a few other oreums on Jeju Island were hydromagmatic volcanoes which were made by piles of volcanic ash, the interaction of hot ascending magma and seawater or ground water. Seongsan Ilchulbong Tuff Cone is 182 meters high, and its crater is about 600 meters in diameter. It has a dip of strata up to 45 degrees and is 90 meters from sea level to the crater floor.

Seongsan Ilchulbong Tuff Cone erupted in very moist and sticky conditions allowing a lot of water to permeate into the volcanic vent, making the diverse depositional features of a wet eruption. The wet hydrovolcanic activity continued until the end of the eruption. Consequently, the tuff has a bowl-like crater unfilled by scoria or lava.

Except for the northwestern park, the Seongsan Ilchulbong Tuff Cone forms a steep cliff because of the resultant wave following its eruptions. Through these eruptions, Seongsan Ilchulbong Tuff Cone shows a perfect cross section from the intracrater strata to the marginal strata. Its diverse geological structures are considered to have great geological importance because they may be used to interpret not only the past volcanic activity of the Seongsan Ilchulbong Tuff Cone but also eruptive and depositional processes of hydromagmatic volcanoes worldwide.

There are numerous hydromagmatic volcanoes similar to the Seongsan Ilchulbong, but there are no other known hydromagmatic volcanoes with a well-preserved tuff cone and diverse internal structures along a sea cliff. Because of these scientific values and remarkable scenery, Seongsan Ilchulbong Tuff Cone was able to be designated as a UNESCO World Natural Heritage site and it is worth preserving permanently as a natural heritage of humankind.

Natural ecosystem
The Seongsan Ilchulbong Tuff Cone's flora is composed of 222 taxa. There are 6 rare plant species: a fern, Crypsinus hastatus, an orchid, Neofinetia falcata, two parasitic plants, Aeginetia indica and Orobanche coerulescens, and two other herbaceous plants, Arisaema heterophyllum and Glehnia littoralis. Aeginetia indica in particular is considered an important plant in terms of plant distribution, because in Korea it can be found only in Jeju Island, in the crater of Seongsan Ilchulbong Tuff Cone. There are additionally 300 species of marine algae on the Seongsan Ilchulbong Tuff Cone. Diverse new species were found in this area including Dasyiphonia chejuensis.

Climbing
It takes usually one hour to climb to the top and to go down, using stairs, for an admission fee. The area is open from 7:10 am to 7 pm in summer and 7:30 am to 6 pm in winter. There is also a luggage storage room before the entrance.

See also
World Heritage Sites in South Korea
Hallasan
Gimnyeonggul
The Geomunoreum Lava Tube System
Manjanggul

References

Jeju Special Self-Governing Provincial Tourism Association

External links
Jeju Volcanic Island and Lava Tubes, UNESCO
Jeju Special Self-Governing Provincial Tourism Association
Jeju Special Self-Governing Province
Jeju World Natural Heritage

Landforms of Jeju Province
Tuff cones
Volcanoes of South Korea